Andimeshk County (Shahrestan'e Andimeshk) is in Khuzestan province, Iran. The capital of the county is the city of Andimeshk. At the 2006 census, the county's population was 154,081 in 33,159 households. The following census in 2011 counted 167,126 people in 42,284 households. At the 2016 census, the county's population was 171,412 in 48,636 households.

Administrative divisions

The population history and structural changes of Andimeshk County's administrative divisions over three consecutive censuses are shown in the following table. The latest census shows two districts, four rural districts, and five cities.

References

 

Counties of Khuzestan Province